Paropsimorpha elegans is a species of leaf beetle found in Australia.

References

External links 

 Callidemum elegans at insectoid.info
 Callidemum elegans at gbif.org

Chrysomelinae
Beetles of Australia